RU.TV is a Russian music TV channel founded by Sergey Kozhevnikov and owned by Russian Media Group. It started broadcasting in October 2006 as the video version of Russkoye Radio.

Programming

In January 2017 RU.TV switched to the 16:9 format and began broadcasting in HDTV.

Broadcast

In several Russian cities—Derbent, Domodedovo, Kaspiysk, Kyzyl, Perm, Simferopol and Makhachkala—RU.TV is on broadcast analog frequencies. Since the channel was carrying commercials before they were banned on broadcast television at the beginning of 2015, it is allowed to continue doing so.

Cable

In Russia RU.TV is carried by ER-Telecom. When it went live in 2009 it was carried on Akado; a year later it moved to National Cable Networks. In Moscow this put RU.TV on Mostelekom; later in 2010 it became available online. In 2012 MTS started carrying the channel.

Satellite

RU.TV is freely available on the Yamal 201 and ABS-2A satellites. Encrypted transmissions come through Eutelsat-36 on Tricolor TV and NTV Plus, as well as Hot Bird and Hispasat 1E.

Network partners

RU.TV partners with Labytnangi-TV in that city, PTK-Avto in Perm and MTV POBEGAILO in Slavgorod.

References

Television channels in Russia
Music television channels
Television channels and stations established in 2006
2006 establishments in Russia
Music organizations based in Russia